Bogatići is a village in the municipality of Trnovo, Republika Srpska, Bosnia and Herzegovina. 

According to the 1991 census it had a population of 77 people.

References

Populated places in Trnovo, Republika Srpska
Villages in Republika Srpska